General elections were held in El Salvador between 26 and 29 March 1950. The result was a victory for Óscar Osorio in the presidential election, and his Revolutionary Party of Democratic Unification in the legislative election.

Results

References

Bibliography
Political Handbook of the world, 1950 New York, 1951
Benítez Manaut, Raúl (1990) "El Salvador: un equilibrio imperfecto entre los votos y las botas" Secuencia 17:71-92
Consejo Central de Elecciones (1951) Memoria de las elecciones de 1950 San Salvador: Secretaria de Información de la Presidencia de la Republica.
Eguizábal, Cristina (1984) "El Salvador: elecciones sin democracia" Polemica 14/15:16-33
Institute for the Comparative Study of Political Systems. 1967. El Salvador election factbook, March 5, 1967. Washington: Institute for the Comparative Study of Political Systems.
Kantor, Harry (1969) Patterns of politics and political systems in Latin America Chicago: Rand McNally & Company
Montgomery, Tommie Sue (1995) Revolution in El Salvador: From civil strife to civil peace Boulder: Westview
Parker, Franklin D (1981) The Central American republics Westport: Greenwood Press
Ruddle, Kenneth (1972) Latin American political statistics Supplement to the statistical abstract of Latin America. Los Angeles: Latin American Center, UCLA
Webre, Stephen (1979) José Napoleón Duarte and the Christian Democratic Party in Salvadoran Politics 1960-1972 Baton Rouge: Louisiana State University Press
Williams, Philip J. and Knut Walter (1997) Militarization and demilitarization in El Salvador's transition to democracy. Pittsburgh: University of Pittsburgh Press

El Salvador
Legislative elections in El Salvador
1950 in El Salvador
Presidential elections in El Salvador
Election and referendum articles with incomplete results